The Battle of Downing Street was a march of suffragettes to Downing Street, London, on 22 November 1910. Organized by Emmeline Pankhurst's Women's Social and Political Union, the march took place four days after Black Friday, a suffragette protest outside the House of Commons that saw the women violently attacked by police.

Prime Minister's statement
Taking place in the context of the debate over the Conciliation Bill 1910 (giving a limited number of women the vote according to property and marital status), the march was a direct response to a statement by the Prime Minister H. H. Asquith that: "The Government will, if they are still in power, give facilities in the next Parliament for effectively proceeding with a Bill which is framed so as to admit of free amendment", which suggested that the bill would have no chance of being passed.

Emmeline and Christabel Pankhurst were at Caxton Hall when news arrived of Asquith's speech; Christabel announced to the audience that it was a declaration of war: "The promise for next parliament is an absurd mockery of a pledge. They have been talking of declarations of war. We also declare war from this moment." Emmeline told the crowd: "I am going to Downing Street. Come along, all of you."

March on Downing Street
Around 200 women marched on Downing Street, smashing windows at the Colonial Office and Home Office, and on Asquith's car; Emmeline Pankhurst and her sister, Mary Clarke, were arrested, along with another 157 women and three men. Clarke was arrested for throwing a stone through the window at Canon Row Police Station, where Pankhurst was being held, after the police refused to let Clarke see her. About 20 women approached 10 Downing Street, the prime minister's residence, from the back and swarmed around Augustine Birrell, the Chief Secretary for Ireland. He said they "pulled me about and hustled me, 'stroked' my face [and] knocked off my hat". In trying to get away, he was left with a twisted knee and slipped kneecap. Birrell did not seek a prosecution; he wrote to the Home Secretary, Winston Churchill, on 21 February 1911: "[L]et the matter drop but keep your eye on the hags in question."

See also
 Women's suffrage in the United Kingdom

References

Works cited

Further reading

1910 in British politics
1910 in London
1910 in women's history
November 1910 events
Downing Street
Feminism and history
Feminist protests
Protests in London
Women's marches
Women's Social and Political Union
Women's suffrage in the United Kingdom
H. H. Asquith